Marcu is a Romanian-language surname and male given name that may refer to:

Dănuț Marcu
Duiliu Marcu
Gavorielle Marcu
Valeriu Marcu
Marcu Beza

See also 
 Mărculești (disambiguation)
 Mărcești (disambiguation)

Romanian-language surnames
Romanian masculine given names